Isaac Hale Beach Park [Hale is a Hawaiian surname, pronounced HAH-leh], also known as Pohoiki, is an oceanfront park, boat launch and surf location on Pohoiki Bay in the Puna district of the Big Island of Hawaii. It was one of only a few places on the southeastern shore of Hawaii that allows for such facilities. Pohoiki Bay is known for its strong currents and large waves, and although the park used to be known for good snorkeling, the 2018 lower Puna eruption covered most of the coral and safer swimming area. The park was expanded and modernized in 2006.

It is located at the intersection of the narrow Pohoiki road and the Kapoho-Kalapana road (Hawaii state route 137).

The park is named in honor of Private Isaac Kepookani Hale.  During the Korean War, Hale served in the United States Army's 19th Infantry Regiment, 24th Infantry Division. He was killed in action north of the 38th parallel on July 12, 1951.

2018 lower Puna Eruption
Lava flows from the 2018 lower Puna eruption covered part of the park's shoreline. However, this lava never completely covered the park, and when the eruption wound down in early August, the front of the lava was still a few hundred feet away from the boat ramp. The boat launch is now partially buried under a new black sand beach that extends along Pohoiki Bay and impounds a geothermal pool accessible from the park.

See also
List of beaches in Hawaii (island)

References

Beaches of Hawaii (island)
Protected areas of Hawaii (island)
Parks in Hawaii
Black sand beaches